Charles Wesley Moore (born c. 1940) is a former American football coach and player. He served as the head football coach at Bethune–Cookman University in Daytona Beach, Florida from 1973 to 1975, Langston University in Langston, Oklahoma in 1977, and the University of the District of Columbia in 1983, compiling a career college football coaching record of 30–23–1.

Moore was hired as the head football coach and athletic director at Langston in 1978.  He resigned in February 1979 after leading Langston to a record of 3–7 in 1978.

Head coaching record

College

References

Year of birth missing (living people)
1940s births
Living people
Bethune–Cookman Wildcats football coaches
UDC Firebirds football coaches
Langston Lions athletic directors
Langston Lions football coaches
Tennessee State Tigers football coaches
Tennessee State Tigers football players